"Solip:System" is a 1989 cyberpunk science fiction novelette by American writer Walter Jon Williams.

Plot introduction
"Solip:System" begins shortly before the ending of Hardwired and continues beyond that point.  In "Solip:System", the main character is the computer personality Reno (a minor character in Hardwired).  The author intended that this book would provide a link between Hardwired and Voice of the Whirlwind.

Series
"Solip:System" is part of a three-book series which includes:

 Hardwired (1986) 
 "Solip:System" (1989) 
 Voice of the Whirlwind (1987)

References

1989 short stories